Lemon La Vida Loca is a British mock reality show created and written by, and starring, comedian Leigh Francis and actress Laura Aikman. The show's title is derived from Ricky Martin's 1999 hit single, "Livin' la Vida Loca".

The series follows the character of television personality Keith Lemon, capturing his home and work life, and everything in between. The series began airing on 2 August 2012 on ITV2, and concluded its first series on 23 August 2012. Whilst on Let's Do Lunch with Gino & Mel, Lemon announced that a Christmas special of Lemon La Vida Loca would air in December. He confirmed this news on his Twitter account as well. A second series began airing on 6 June 2013. Aikman announced that she would not be returning to the show for the second series, but she did make an appearance on the first episode of the second series.

It was announced in January 2014 that Lemon La Vida Loca would not be renewed for a third series.

Cast

Main cast
 Leigh Francis as Keith Lemon
 Laura Aikman as Rosie Parker (2012–13)

Celebrity cameos

Episodes

Series 1 (2012)

Christmas specials (2012)

Series 2 (2013)
The second series began on 6 June 2013 at 10pm on ITV2.

Distribution
The complete first and second series of Lemon La Vida Loca was released onto DVD on 18 November 2013 as a three-disc set.

References

External links
Lemon La Vida Loca at ITV.com

2012 British television series debuts
2013 British television series endings
2010s British comedy television series
ITV comedy
Reality television series parodies
Television series by Fremantle (company)
Television shows adapted into films
English-language television shows